This is a list of the butterflies of India belonging to the subfamily Pyrginae of the family Hesperiidae and an index to the species articles. The butterflies of this subfamily are commonly referred to as flats because of their habit of holding the wings flat at all times. They are also known as "angles", "elfs" or "grizzled skippers".

This list forms part of the full List of butterflies of India (Hesperiidae) which itself is part of the complete List of butterflies of India.

A total of 69 species belonging to 21 genera are found in India.

Checklist

Capila - dawnflies

Evans (1932) had listed the various species of Capila under a number of different genera:

Orthopaetus group (dawnflies)
 Lidderdale's dawnfly, Capila lidderdali (Elwes, 1888)
 Fulvous dawnfly, Capila phanaeus (Hewitson, 1867)
Capila group (striped dawnflies)
 Pale striped dawnfly, Capila zennara (Moore, 1865)
 Striped dawnfly, Capila jayadeva (Moore, 1865)
Crossiura group (fringed dawnfly)
 Fringed dawnfly, Capila pennicillatum (de Nicéville, 1893)
Calliana group (white dawnfly)
 White dawnfly, Capila pieridoides (Moore, 1878) (Calliana pieridoides as per LepIndex)

Caprona - angles

 Golden angle, Caprona ransonnetti (Felder, 1868)
 Spotted angle, Caprona agama (Moore, 1857)

Carcharodus - mallow skipper

 Mallow skipper, Carcharodus alceae (Esper, 1780)
 Carcharodus dravira (Moore, [1875])

Chamunda - olive flat

 Olive flat, Chamunda chamunda (Moore, 1865)

Coladenia - pied flats

 Brown pied flat, Coladenia agni (de Nicéville, 1883)
 Tricolour pied flat, Coladenia indrani (Moore, 1865)
 Elwes' pied flat, Coladenia agnioides Elwes & Edwards, 1897

Ctenoptilum - tawny angle

 Tawny angle, Ctenoptilum vasava (Moore, 1865)

Darpa - hairy angle

 Hairy angle, Darpa hanria (Moore, 1865)
 Darpa striata (H. Druce, 1873)
 Darpa pteria (Hewitson, 1868)

Gerosis - yellow-breast flats

Common yellow-breast flat, Gerosis bhagava (Moore, [1866])
Dusky yellow-breast flat, Gerosis phisara (Moore, 1884)
Chinese yellow-breast flat, Gerosis sinica (C. Felder & R. Felder, 1862)

Gomalia - marbled skipper

 African mallow/marbled skipper, Gomalia elma (Trimen, 1862)

Lobocla - marbled flat

 Marbled flat, Lobocla liliana (Atkinson, 1871)

Mooreana - yellow flat

 Yellow flat, Mooreana trichoneura (M. t. pralaya, (Moore, 1865))

Odina - zigzag flat

 Zigzag flat, Odina decoratus Hewitson, 1867
 Odina hieroglyphica (Butler, 1870)

Odontoptilum - chestnut angle

 Chestnut/banded angle, Odontoptilum angulatum (Felder, 1862)

Pseudocoladenia

 Fulvous pied flat, Pseudocoladenia dan (Fabricius, 1787) previously Coladenia dan
 Pseudocoladenia festa (Evans, 1949)
 Pseudocoladenia fatua (Evans, 1949)

Pyrgus - grizzled skippers

 Pyrgus alpinus (Erschoff, 1874)
 Pyrgus cashmirensis Moore, 1874

Sarangesa - small flats

 Common small flat, Sarangesa dasahara (Moore, 1865)
 Spotted small flat, Sarangesa purendra (Moore, 1882)
 Tiny flat, Sarangesa sati de Nicéville, 1891

Satarupa - white flats

 Large white flat, Satarupa gopala (Moore, 1865)
 Satarupa splendens Tytler, 1914

Seseria - white flats

 Himalayan white flat, Seseria dohertyi Watson, 1863
 Sikkim white flat, Seseria sambara (Moore, 1865)

Spialia - grizzled skippers

 Indian grizzled skipper or Indian skipper, Spialia galba (Fabricius, 1793)
 Desert grizzled skipper, Spialia doris (Walker, 1870)
 Zebra grizzled skipper, Spialia zebra (Butler, 1888)

Tagiades - snow flats

 Flat, Tagiades cohaerens Mabille, 1914 (T. c. cynthia Evans, 1934)
 Ceylon snow flat, Tagiades distans Moore
 Immaculate/large/suffused snow flat, Tagiades gana (Moore, 1865)
 Common snow flat, Tagiades japetus (Stoll, 1781)
 Water snow flat, Tagiades litigiosa (Möschler, 1878)
 Spotted snow flat, Tagiades menaka (Moore, 1865)
 Tagiades parra Frühstorfer, 1910
 Tagiades toba de Nicéville, 1896

Tapena - black angle

 Black angle, Tapena thwaitesi Moore, 1881

See also
Pyrginae
Hesperiidae
List of butterflies of India
List of butterflies of India (Hesperiidae)

Cited references

References
Print

 

Pyrginae
Pyrginae
B